The 1935–36 IHL season was the seventh and final season of the International Hockey League, a minor professional ice hockey league in the Midwestern and Eastern United States and Canada. Eight teams participated in the league, and the Detroit Olympics won the championship.

Regular season

Eastern Division

Western Division

Playoffs

Quarterfinals

2 games total goals

Buffalo beat Cleveland 3 goals to 2.

Windsor beat London 4 goals to 3.

Semifinals

Best of 5

Detroit beat Syracuse 3 wins to none.

Best of 3

Windsor beat Buffalo 2 wins to 1.

Final

Best of 5

Detroit beat Windsor 3 wins to none.

External links
Season on hockeydb.com

1935 in ice hockey
1936 in ice hockey